Alice Werner (26 June 1859 - 9 June 1935) was a writer, poet and teacher of the Bantu languages.

Life
Alice Werner was one of seven children in the family of Reinhardt Joseph Werner of Mainz, teacher of languages, and his wife, Harriett. Her father travelled extensively during the first fifteen years of her life, and she lived in New Zealand, Mexico, United States and throughout Europe, until the family settled in Tonbridge, England, in 1874.

After visiting Nyasaland in 1893 and Natal in 1894, her writings were focused on African themes.

In 1917 she joined the School of Oriental Studies, moving up from lecturer to reader to professor of Swahili and Bantu languages, and retiring in 1929-1930. She was awarded a D.Litt. in 1928 from London University as a result of her specialised teaching and research. Following her retirement, she received the title of Emeritus Professor from the same university. In 1931 she was awarded the Silver Medal of the African Society, of which she was Vice-President.

Although not known as a major poet, her poem "Bannerman of Dandenong" has appeared in a number of important Australian poetry anthologies.

She lived for a time with Lillias Campbell Davidson, American founder of the British Lady Cyclists' Association, and Ménie Muriel Dowie, a British writer of the New Woman  school. According to The New York Times:

Works

 A Time and Times (poems) (1886)
 O'Driscoll's Weird (1892)
 The Humour of Italy (1892)
 The Humour of Holland (1893)
 The Captain of the Locusts (1899)
 Chapinga's While Man (1901)
 Native Races of British Central Africa (1906)
 "Introduction" to Jamaican Song and Story: Annancy Stories, Digging Sings, Ring Tunes, and Dancing Tunes, ed. Walter Jekyll (1906)
 The Language Families of Africa (1915)
 A Swahili History of Pate (1915)
 Introductory Sketch of the Bantu Languages (1919)
 The Swahili Saga of Liongo Fumo (1926)
 A First Swahili Book (1927; written with M. H. Werner)
 Swahili Tales (1929)
 Structure and Relationship of African Languages (1930)
 The Story of Miqdad and Mayasa (1932)
 Myths and Legends of the Bantu (1933)

References

Archives
 The papers of Alice Werner are held at SOAS Archives. Digitised material from the collection can be viewed online here.

External links

1859 births
1935 deaths
German women writers
Writers from Trieste